G-Phoria is a former annual video game awards show started in 2003 and ended in 2009, produced by and for the defunct G4 network.

Formerly the event was formatted like a regular awards ceremony taped in front of an audience, featuring celebrities such as Hal Sparks, Carmen Electra, Wilmer Valderrama and Anna Nicole Smith, and musical performances, along with a red carpet preview show, and some game premieres. In 2006, the control of the show was given over to X-Play, which made it a pure viewer's choice show hosted by Adam Sessler and Morgan Webb. After 2009 G-Phoria's honors were effectively blended into the traditional "year in review" show aired by X-Play in mid-December of each year until the show's end in 2012.

Winners of G-Phoria

2003 

Best Adaptation: The Lord of the Rings: The Two Towers
Best Brawl: Mortal Kombat: Deadly Alliance
Best Cinematic: Warcraft III: Reign of Chaos
Best Graphics: Tom Clancy's Splinter Cell
Best Handheld/Mobile game: The Legend of Zelda: A Link to the Past/Four Swords
Best Live Action/Voice Male Performance: Ray Liotta, Grand Theft Auto: Vice City
Best Live Action/Voice Female Performance: Jenna Jameson, Grand Theft Auto: Vice City
Best Online Game: Battlefield 1942
Best Revival: The Legend of Zelda: The Wind Waker
Best Rookie: Tom Clancy's Splinter Cell
Best Soundtrack: Grand Theft Auto: Vice City
Best Sports Game: Madden NFL 2003
Best Story: Kingdom Hearts
Best Villain: Ganon, The Legend of Zelda: The Wind Waker
Best Weapon: Light Saber, Star Wars Jedi Knight II: Jedi Outcast
Character You'd Most Like To Be: Dante, Devil May Cry 2
Coolest Cheat/Easter Egg: Unlock original game, Panzer Dragoon Orta
EB Gamers Choice Award: Grand Theft Auto: Vice City
Game of the Year: Grand Theft Auto: Vice City
Guiltiest Pleasure: Dead or Alive Xtreme Beach Volleyball
Hottest Character: Tina Armstrong, Dead or Alive Xtreme Beach Volleyball
Most Annoying Character: Zill, The Legend of Zelda: The Wind Waker
Most Innovative Game: Animal Crossing
Most Underrated Game: Super Mario Sunshine

2004 

Alt Sports Award Powered by Mountain Dew: Tony Hawk's Underground
Best Adaptation: Star Wars: Knights of the Old Republic
Best Cinematic: Final Fantasy X-2
Best Easter Egg: Snoop Dogg Cheat, True Crime: Streets of LA
Best Graphics: Ninja Gaiden
Best Handheld Game: Final Fantasy Tactics Advance
Best Innovation: Tom Clancy's Splinter Cell: Pandora Tomorrow, multi-player mode
Best Mobile Phone Game: Bejeweled multiplayer
Best Multiplayer Game: Unreal Tournament 2004
Best New Franchise: Call of Duty
Best Racing Game: Need for Speed Underground
Best RPG: Star Wars: Knights of the Old Republic
Best Sound Design: The Lord of the Rings: The Return of the King
Best Soundtrack: Tony Hawk's Underground
Best Traditional Sports Game: Madden NFL 2004
Best Voice Female Performance: Jada Pinkett Smith, Enter the Matrix
Best Voice Male Performance: Pierce Brosnan, James Bond 007: Everything or Nothing
Favorite Character: Ryu Hayabusa, Ninja Gaiden
Game of the Year: Star Wars: Knights of the Old Republic
Hottest Character: Rikku, Final Fantasy X-2
EB Gamers Choice: Star Wars: Knights of the Old Republic

2005 

Alt Sports Award Fueled by Mountain Dew: NBA Street V3
Best Adaptation: LEGO Star Wars: The Video Game
Best Action Game: God of War
Best Boss: Scarab Battle, Halo 2
Best Cinematic: God of War
Best Graphics: Half-Life 2
Best Handheld Game: The Legend of Zelda: The Minish Cap
Best Innovation: Katamari Damacy
Best Licensed Soundtrack: Grand Theft Auto: San Andreas
Best Multiplayer Game: Halo 2
Best Original Game: God of War
Best Original Soundtrack: Halo 2
Best Racing Game: Burnout 3: Takedown
Best RPG: Star Wars Knights of the Old Republic II: The Sith Lords
Best Shooter: Halo 2
Best Sound Design: Halo 2
Best Traditional Sports Game: Madden NFL 2005
Best Voice Female Performance: Merle Dandridge, Half-Life 2
Best Voice Male Performance: David Cross, Halo 2
EB Gamers Choice Award: World of Warcraft
Favorite Character: Kratos, God of War
Game of the Year: Halo 2
Legend Award Presented by Jeep: Ralph H. Baer

2006 

Best Action Game: Shadow of the Colossus
Best Voice Acting: Kingdom Hearts II
Best Shooter: Call of Duty 2
Best Alt Sports Game: Mario Superstar Baseball
Best Handheld Game: Mario Kart DS
Best Original Game: Guitar Hero
Best Soundtrack: Kingdom Hearts II
Best Strategy: Star Wars: Empire at War
Best RPG: The Elder Scrolls IV: Oblivion
Best Multiplayer: Ghost Recon: Advanced Warfighter
Best Looking Game: The Elder Scrolls IV: Oblivion
Best Traditional Sports Game: Fight Night Round 3
Game of the Year: The Elder Scrolls IV: Oblivion

2007 

Best System: Xbox 360
Best New Character: Marcus Fenix, Gears of War
Best Hottest Babe: Kasumi, Dead or Alive Xtreme 2
Best Strategy: Command & Conquer 3: Tiberium Wars
Best Sports: Wii Sports
Best Action: Gears of War
Best RPG: The Legend of Zelda: Twilight Princess
Best Most Original: Dead Rising
Best Multiplayer: Gears of War
Best Downloadable Content: The Elder Scrolls IV: Shivering Isles
Best Handheld: Pokémon Diamond and Pearl
Best Voiceover: The Mighty Rasta as Augustus Cole, Gears of War
Best Graphics: Gears of War
Best Soundtrack: Guitar Hero 2
Best Deserves Uwe Boll Movie: Red Steel
Best Stride Longest Lasting Game: The Legend of Zelda: Twilight Princess
Game of the Year: Gears of War

2008 

Game of the Year: Halo 3
Favorite System: Xbox 360
Best Graphics: Metal Gear Solid 4: Guns of the Patriots
Best New Character: Niko Bellic, Grand Theft Auto IV
Best Party Game: Rock Band
Best Strategy Game: Sid Meier's Civilization Revolution
Best Sports Game: skate.
Best Action Game: Grand Theft Auto IV
Best Shooter: Call of Duty 4: Modern Warfare
Best Racing Game: Mario Kart Wii
Best RPG Game: Mass Effect
Most Original: Portal
Best Online Player Game: Call of Duty 4: Modern Warfare
Best Downloadable Content: Rock Band
Best Handheld Game: God of War: Chains of Olympus
Best Voice Acting: Metal Gear Solid 4: Guns of the Patriots
Best Soundtrack: Rock Band
Game Most Deserving of an Uwe Boll Movie: Turok
Longest Lasting Game Presented By Stride: Grand Theft Auto IV

2009 

Best Action Game: Infamous
Best Downloadable Content: Fallout 3: Broken Steel
Best Downloadable Game: Castle Crashers
Best Graphics: Killzone 2
Best Handheld Game: Grand Theft Auto: Chinatown Wars
Best New Character: Sackboy, LittleBigPlanet
Best Online Multiplayer: Left 4 Dead
Best Party Game: Rock Band 2
Best Racing Game: Burnout Paradise: Big Surf Island
Best Role-Playing Game: Fallout 3
Best Shooter: Gears of War 2
Best Soundtrack: Fallout 3
Best Sports Game: Fight Night Round 4
Best Strategy Game: Halo Wars
Best Voice Acting: Fallout 3
Deserves an Uwe Boll Movie: Legendary
Favorite System: Xbox 360
Game of the Year: Fallout 3
Most Original Game: LittleBigPlanet
Longest Lasting Game: Fallout 3

References 

G4 (American TV network) original programming
Video game awards
X-Play